John Luther Vance (July 19, 1839 – June 10, 1921) was a U.S. Representative from Ohio.

Biography
Vance was born in Gallipolis, Ohio and attended the public schools and Gallia Academy, Ohio.

He graduated from the Cincinnati Law School in April 1861, and was admitted to the bar the same year.

Civil War service
He enlisted in April 1861 in the Union Army and served successively as captain, major, and lieutenant colonel in the 4th West Virginia Volunteer Infantry Regiment until he mustered out in December 1864.

Postbellum
After the war he established and published the Gallipolis Bulletin in 1867 and commenced the practice of law in Gallipolis, Ohio, in 1870.

He served as delegate to the 1872 Democratic National Convention and was elected as a Democrat to the Forty-fourth Congress (March 4, 1875 – March 3, 1877).

He was an unsuccessful candidate for reelection in 1876 to the Forty-fifth Congress and resumed his former newspaper business.

He served as president of the Ohio River Improvement Association from shortly after 1877 until his death.

He died in Gallipolis, Ohio, on June 10, 1921, and was interred in Pine Street Cemetery.

Vance was married to Emily F. Shepard of Gallipolis on October 4, 1866. They had four children.

Vance was a member of the Masonic fraternity, and the Grand Army of the Republic.

References

 Retrieved on 2008-11-05

1839 births
1921 deaths
People from Gallipolis, Ohio
Ohio lawyers
Union Army officers
19th-century American newspaper editors
University of Cincinnati College of Law alumni
Democratic Party members of the United States House of Representatives from Ohio
Journalists from Ohio
19th-century American lawyers